José Jiménez Ruiz (born 24 May 1946) is a Spanish Air Force general. He became Chief of Staff of the Air Force on 18 July 2008. General Francisco Javier García Arnáiz replaced him on 31 July de 2012.

Dates of rank
 Caballero - 1966
 Alférez Alumno - 1968
 Teniente - 1970
 Capitán - 1974
 Comandante - 1983
 Teniente Coronel - 1989
 Coronel - 1997
 General de Brigada - 2001
 General de División - 2005
 Teniente General - 2008
 General del Aire - 2008

References

1946 births
Living people
Military personnel from Madrid
Spanish generals